The 2015 Asian Sevens Series was the seventh Asian Sevens Series held by Asia Rugby. The winner and runner-up of the competition gaining entry into the World Series qualifying tournament (to become a core team in 2017) at the 2016 Hong Kong Sevens.

The first leg of the 2015 Asian Sevens Series was held at the Tiantai Stadium in Qingdao on 5 and 6 September. The biggest surprise of that tournament was that for the first time since 2011 Hong Kong failed to make the finals, losing in the quarterfinals to the Chinese, 21–17. The Chinese were successful in the semi-finals defeating Sri Lanka 22–12 garnering their first cup final appearance against Japan, who defeated South Korea by 21–5 in their semi-final. The Japanese went on to win the Cup final by defeating the Chinese by 28–12. In the Plate final Hong Kong defeated Kazakhstan 27–0 and in the Bowl final UAE were successful against Singapore 15–7.

The second leg of the series was held in Thailand on 26 and 27 September. In this leg Japan, and South Korea, successfully made their way through the competition unbeaten. Japan coming from behind to win a tense encounter 24–19, against Hong Kong in the semi-final, scoring a golden try in sudden death extra-time.  Japan then repeated their earlier result in Shanghai, easily winning the Cup 45–7 against South Korea. The Plate final was contested between UAE and China, with China securing the Plate with a 26–5 victory, whilst in the Bowl final Thailand defeated the Philippines 24–19.

The last leg was held at the Colombo Racecourse in Sri Lanka on 10 and 11 October. Japan booked their berth in the Cup final with a 31–5 victory over China in the quarter-final and a hard-fought 26–19 win over hosts Sri Lanka in the semi-final. Hong Kong beat Chinese Taipei 33–5 in their quarter-final before hammering Malaysia 38–7 in the semi-finals. Hong Kong’s path to the final was made easier by the shock loss of South Korea to Thailand in the preliminary rounds. Japan secured a clean sweep of the series winning their third Cup by defeating Hong Kong 29–22. South Korea won the Plate final, with a 17–10 victory over Chinese Taipei.

The winner of the 2015 Asian Sevens Series was Japan, who won all three legs, the remaining places on the podium went to Hong Kong and South Korea, with their final position determined by the difference of points.

Teams 
12 teams competed in the tournament.

Tour venues

China 
The China 7s was held in Qingdao from September 5-6.

Pool stages 
Pool A

Pool B

Pool C

Pool D

Knockout stages 
Bowl

Plate

Cup

Thailand 
The Thailand 7s was held in Bangkok September 26-27.

Pool stages 
Pool A

Pool B

Pool C

Pool D

Knockout stages 
Bowl

Plate

Cup

Sri Lanka 
The Sri Lanka 7s was held in Colombo from October 10-11. Kazakhstan withdrew from the tournament leaving only Hong Kong and China in pool C.

Pool stages 
Pool A

Pool B

Pool C

Pool D

Knockout stages 
Bottom 3 playoff

 - 9th
 - 10th
 - 11th

Plate
{{Round4-with third||13=17|RD2=5th-place final|20=19|19=|18=26|17=|16=|15=10|14=|12=||11=|10=0|9=|8=21|7=|6=|5=5|4=|7|Consol=7th Place

}}Cup'''

Final standings

References

    
2015 rugby sevens competitions
2015 in Asian rugby union
2015